Usingo Island (Kisiwa cha Usingo) is the name given to a small lake island in Kenya, which is located in Migori County, in Lake Victoria.

Geography
This island is still largely uninhabited, unlike its neighbour, the densely populated Migingo Island. Only one family lives on the island in recent periods due to the overpopulation of the neighboring island of Migingo and the lack of space for agriculture and livestock. The island is home to goats and white herons.

See also
Migingo Island
Pyramid Island
Geography of Kenya

References

Lake islands of Kenya